The Extraordinary and Plenipotentiary Ambassador of Peru to the Republic of Poland is the official representative of the Republic of Peru to the Republic of Poland. The Ambassador to Poland is also accredited to Ukraine.

Both countries officially established relations in 1923. Although originally of a stable nature, the invasion of Poland and the outbreak of World War II led to the withdrawal and reestablishment of Peruvian recognition of different entities representing a Polish government until 1967, when Peru officially reestablished relations, now with the Polish People's Republic.

Peruvian president Alan García visited Poland some time before the 1990 Polish presidential election, on September 1989. Since the socialist government's collapse, both nations have continued their relations, with both countries signing treaties and with more government visits between both states taking place.

List of representatives

Republic of Poland (1923–1945)

Polish People's Republic (1967–1989)

Republic of Poland (1989–present)

See also
List of ambassadors of Ukraine to Peru
List of ambassadors of Peru to the Soviet Union
List of ambassadors of Peru to Czechoslovakia
List of ambassadors of Peru to East Germany
List of ambassadors of Peru to Yugoslavia
List of ambassadors of Peru to Bulgaria
List of ambassadors of Peru to Albania
List of ambassadors of Peru to Hungary
List of ambassadors of Peru to Romania

Notes

References

Poland
Peru